One Nation Underground may refer to:

One Nation Underground (Pearls Before Swine album) (1967)
One Nation Underground (Hawaii album) (1983)
One Nation Underground (Ill Niño album) (2005)